67th National Board of Review Awards

Best Picture: 
 Sense and Sensibility 
The 67th National Board of Review Awards, honoring the best in filmmaking in 1995, were announced on 13 December 1995 and given on 26 February 1996.

Top 10 films
Sense and Sensibility
Apollo 13
Carrington
Leaving Las Vegas
The American President
Mighty Aphrodite
Smoke
Persuasion
Braveheart
The Usual Suspects

Top Foreign films
Farinelli
Lamerica
Les Misérables
Il Postino: The Postman
Shanghai Triad

Winners
Best Actor:
Nicolas Cage - Leaving Las Vegas
Best Actress:
Emma Thompson - Sense and Sensibility and Carrington
Best Cast:
The Usual Suspects
Best Director:
Ang Lee - Sense and Sensibility
Best Documentary Feature:
Crumb
Best Film: 
Sense and Sensibility
Best Foreign Film:
Shanghai Triad
Best Screenplay:
Betty Comden and Adolph Green - Career Achievement
Best Supporting Actor:
Kevin Spacey - The Usual Suspects, Se7en
Best Supporting Actress:
Mira Sorvino - Mighty Aphrodite
Breakthrough Performance:
Alicia Silverstone - Clueless
Best TV Film:
The Boys of St. Vincent
Distinction in Screenwriting:
Betty Comden, Adolph Green
Special Filmmaking Achievement:
Mel Gibson - Braveheart
Freedom of Expression Award:
Zhang Yimou
Billy Wilder Award:
Stanley Donen
Career Achievement Award:
James Earl Jones

External links
National Board of Review of Motion Pictures :: Awards for 1995

1995 film awards
1995